Arthur Anae (born 1945) is a New Zealand politician who served on the Auckland Council. He was an MP from 1996 to 1999, and again from 2000 to 2002. He was part of the National Party, being its first Pacific Islander MP.

Early life
Anae, who was born in 1945, is Samoan, although he was born in Fiji. His family migrated to New Zealand in 1951 when he was five years old.

Member of Parliament

He first entered Parliament in the 1996 election as a list MP (he did not contest an electorate), but after the 1999 election, missed returning to Parliament by a single place. When Don McKinnon resigned, however, Anae entered Parliament as his replacement. In the 2002 election, Anae was ranked lowly on the party list (in 28th place), could not win the  electorate (he came a distant second to Labour's Ross Robertson), and was thus not returned to Parliament. At the time, he was highly critical of the National Party for his low list ranking and perceived it as an insult to the Pacific community.

Local politics

Anae first stood for Auckland City Council in the 1987 local elections. In October 2004 he was elected to the Manukau City Council from the Otara ward. He ran for the mayoralty of Manukau City in the 2007 local body elections, polling third.

In the 2010 Auckland Council elections Anae was elected from the Manukau ward to serve in the newly formed Auckland Council and served as the Chair of the Council's Economic Forum. He was re-elected in 2013, but did not stand at the 2016 elections, and opted to leave politics. His seat was won by Efeso Collins at the 2016 elections.

References

1945 births
New Zealand people of Samoan descent
Auckland Councillors
New Zealand National Party MPs
People from the Auckland Region
New Zealand list MPs
Manukau City Councillors
Members of the New Zealand House of Representatives
Living people
Unsuccessful candidates in the 1999 New Zealand general election
Unsuccessful candidates in the 2002 New Zealand general election
21st-century New Zealand politicians
Unsuccessful candidates in the 1993 New Zealand general election